Cham-e Nar (also Romanized as Cham-e Nār and Cham Nār) is a village in Saman Rural District, Saman County, Chaharmahal and Bakhtiari Province, Iran. At the 2006 census, its population was 230, in 67 families. The village is populated by Turkic people.

References 

Populated places in Saman County